The Hoogovens Wijk aan Zee Steel Chess Tournament 1987 was the 49th edition of the Wijk aan Zee Chess Tournament. It was held in Wijk aan Zee in January 1987. The tournament was won by 1986 champion Nigel Short and Viktor Korchnoi, earning his fourth title.

{| class="wikitable" style="text-align: center;"
|+ 49th Hoogovens tournament, group A, 15 January – 4 February 1987, Wijk aan Zee, Netherlands, Category XIII (2556)
! !! Player !! Rating !! 1 !! 2 !! 3 !! 4 !! 5 !! 6 !! 7 !! 8 !! 9 !! 10 !! 11 !! 12 !! 13 !! 14 !! Total !! TPR !! Place
|-
|-style="background:#ccffcc;"
| 1 || align="left"| || 2615 ||  || 1 || ½ || ½ || ½ || ½ || ½ || ½ || 1|| 1 || 1|| 1 || ½ || 1 || 9½ || 2726 || 1–2
|-
|-style="background:#ccffcc;"
| 2 || align="left"| || 2625 || 0 ||  || ½ || 1 || 1 || ½ || ½ || 1 || ½ || 1 || ½ || 1 || 1 || 1 || 9½ || 2725 || 1–2
|-
| 3 || align="left" | || 2600 || ½ || ½ ||  || ½ || 1 || ½ || ½ || 1 || ½ || ½ || ½ || 1 || ½ || ½ || 8 || 2639 || 3
|-
| 4 || align="left" | || 2565 || ½ || 0 || ½ ||  || ½ || ½ || ½ || ½ || 1 || ½ || ½ || 1 || ½ || 1 || 7½ || 2612 || 4
|-
| 5 || align="left" | || 2505 || ½ || 0 || 0 || ½ ||  || 1 || 1 || 1 || 0 || 1 || ½ || 0 || ½ || 1 || 7 || 2589 || 5–6
|-
| 6 || align="left" | || 2565 || ½ || ½ || ½ || ½ || 0 ||  || ½ || 0 || 1 || ½ || ½ || ½ || 1 || 1 || 7 || 2584 || 5–6
|-
| 7 || align="left" | || 2530 || ½ || ½ || ½ || ½ || 0 || ½ ||  || ½ || ½ || ½ || ½ || ½ || 1 || ½ || 6½ || 2558 || 7–9
|-
| 8 || align="left" | || 2520 || ½ || 0 || 0 || ½ || 0 || 1 || ½ ||  || 1 || ½ || ½ || 0 || 1 || 1 || 6½ || 2558 || 7–9
|-
| 9 || align="left" | || 2620 || ½ || ½ || 0 || 1 || 0 || 0 || ½ || 0 ||  || ½ || ½ || 1 || 1 || 1 || 6½ || 2551 || 7–9
|-
| 10 || align="left" | || 2550 || 0 || 0 || ½ || ½ || 0 || ½ || ½ || ½ || ½ ||  || ½ || ½ || 1 || 1 || 6 || 2527 || 10
|-
| 11 || align="left" | || 2520 || 0 || ½ || ½ || ½ || ½ || ½ || ½ || ½ || ½ || ½ ||  || 1 || 0 || 0 || 5½ || 2501 || 11
|- 
| 12 || align="left" | || 2540 || 0 || 0 || 0 || 0 || 1 || ½ || ½ || 1 || 0 || ½ || 0 ||  || ½ || ½ || 4½ || 2447  || 12–13
|-
| 13 || align="left" | || 2495 || ½ || 0 || ½ || ½ || ½ || 0 || 0 || 0 || 0 || 0 || 1 || ½ ||  || 1 || 4½ || 2450 || 12–13
|-
| 14 || align="left" | || 2530 || 0 || 0 || ½ || 0 || 0 || 0 || ½ || 0 || 0 || 0 || 1 || ½ || 0 ||  || 2½ || 2307 || 14
|}

References

Tata Steel Chess Tournament
1987 in chess
1987 in Dutch sport